Krasnaya Zvezda is a rural locality (a village) in Argunovskoye Rural Settlement, Nikolsky District, Vologda Oblast, Russia. The population was 49 as of 2002.

Geography 
Krasnaya Zvezda is located 54 km northwest of Nikolsk (the district's administrative centre) by road. Telyanino is the nearest rural locality.

References 

Rural localities in Nikolsky District, Vologda Oblast